Clubul Sportiv Medgidia, commonly known as CS Medgidia, or simply as Medgidia, is a Romanian sports club from Medgidia, Constanța County, Romania, founded in 1952. 

Its professional football club currently play in the Liga III. Apart from football the club also competes in handball, volleyball, wrestling, boxing, arm wrestling, swimming, chess, and rugby.

History 
CS Medgidia was founded in 1952 as Cimentul Medgidia (Medgidia Cement), name that was in close contact with the club's owner Medgidia Cement Factory. Over time the club was named also as Voința I.C.S. and Cimentul Voința being a team with constant appearances in the second and third tiers. The local rival of Cimentul was I.M.U. Medgidia, club named over time also as I.M.U. C.S. Școlar and Progresul C.S.Ș.

1999–2000 season of Divizia C was the last one for the club under the name of Cimentul, in the summer of 2000 the club was renamed as CSM Medgidia. In 2002 the club promoted back in Liga II, but after two seasons chose to sell its place to Liberty Salonta and continued to play in the Liga III until 2010, when the club withdrew from championship, then being dissolved.

In the summer of 2017, the team was re-founded as CS Medgidia and was enrolled in the Liga IV, promoting back in the Liga III after only one season.

Honours
Liga III
Winners (3): 1974–75, 1978–79, 2001–02

Liga IV – Constanța County
Winners (3): 1991–92, 2006–07, 2017–18
Runners-up (1): 2021–22

Club Officials

Board of directors

Current technical staff

League history

References

External links

CS Medgidia at AJF Constanţa

Association football clubs established in 1952
Football clubs in Constanța County
Liga II clubs
Liga III clubs
Liga IV clubs
1952 establishments in Romania